Thomas Kerrich (4 February 1748 – 10 May 1828) was an English clergyman, principal Cambridge University librarian (Protobibliothecarius), antiquary, draughtsman and gifted amateur artist. He created one of the first catalogue raisonnés (for the works of the artist Marten van Heemskerck).

Life
Thomas Kerrich was born at Dersingham in Norfolk, England, where his father, Samuel, was the vicar. After graduating B.A. from Magdalene College, Cambridge, in 1771, he went on the Grand Tour where he encountered Thomas Coke. Kerrich was a Fellow of Magdalene, and a Fellow of the Society of Antiquaries from 1797.

He collected ancient Roman coins and published papers on architecture, sepulchres and coffins.

In 1816, he bought and restored the Leper Chapel in Cambridge. He gave the chapel to the university, which in turn gave it the Cambridge Preservation Society in 1951. Many art galleries have works by Kerrich in their collections.

Kerrich died in Cambridge on 10 May 1828.

Personal life
Kerrich married Sophia Hayles (1762–1835), fourth daughter of the physician Richard Hayles, on 13 September 1798.

The couple had one son and two daughters. The younger daughter, Frances Margaretta Kerrich, was married on 9 December 1828 to Rev. Charles Henry Hartshorne (1802–1865). The son was the Rev. Richard Edward Kerrich (1801–1872).

Publications

References

Further reading

External links
Description of Barnwell Leper Chapel, including a watercolour by Richard Relhan
The Annual Biography and Obituary for the year 1829, Vol. 13, Longman, Rees, Orme, Brown and Green, London, 1829, pp. 278–300.

1748 births
1828 deaths
English librarians
English artists
Alumni of Magdalene College, Cambridge
Cambridge University Librarians
People from Dersingham